Kleinwalsertal is a valley in the Austrian province of Vorarlberg and part of the Bregenz district. It includes the municipality  of Mittelberg and consists of three villages along the River Breitach. Due to the geographic location in the Allgäu Alps with its alpine terrain, the Kleinwalsertal has no direct traffic connection to the rest of Vorarlberg. It is accessible only via Oberstdorf, Germany, to the north, and thus is an Austrian "practical exclave" or "pene-exclave".

Etymology
The name of the valley derives from the Walsers who moved there from the Valais in the 13th century (see also "Großwalsertal").

Geography

Natural geography
The Kleinwalsertal is a high valley in the Allgäu Alps and is located in the east of Vorarlberg. The Breitach river runs through the entire valley and is fed by a few side streams, which come from the side valleys of the Kleinwalsertal.

The Kleinwalsertal is almost completely surrounded by high mountains of the Allgäu Alps, which are part of the northern eastern Alps.

The Kleinwalsertal is cut off from the rest of Austria. A traffic connection exists only to the Bavarian town of Oberstdorf.

Drinking water originates from five main springs of the valley, namely Kaltes Bächle ("Chalta Bächle") in Mittelberg, Humbachquelle, Walmendingerquellen, Quelle Sattelalp and Quelle Lüchle. As of 2021, the water quality was excellent.

Human geography
The Kleinwalsertal includes the municipality of part of Mittelberg and consists of three villages which are situated along the River Breitach: Mittelberg, Hirschegg and Riezlern.

The official name of this entire municipality is Mittelberg after the first populated place. On an area of  live 4,902 inhabitants with primary residence, which results in a population density of almost 51 inhabitants per square kilometre.

History
Finds of arrowheads and stone tools prove human settlement during stone age, 7000 years BC. At the Bärenkopf, a small mine for radiolarite was found. This was  mined to produce stone tools and arrowheads.
The Kleinwalsertal was populated by the Walsers in 1270, a group of people who migrated from what is now Switzerland. This Alemannic origin still distinguishes the inhabitants from the inhabitants of the surrounding communities by their dialect.

From 1891 until 1995, the Kleinwalsertal enjoyed a customs union with Germany, a free border, and used the German Marks as currency. Since Austria joined the European Union in 1995, followed by the signing of the Schengen Agreement (1997) and the introduction of the Euro (2002), this special status has no longer applied.

With EU accession goods from Austria had to be cleared in Germany or the import turnover tax had to be paid while German goods were free of taxes. Taxes were to be paid to the Austrian tax office in D-Mark until the introduction of the Euro. A special tariff was also applied to Swiss Post. Shipments to Austria were calculated according to the domestic tariffs of Austrian Post, those to Germany were to be freed with domestic porti of the Federal Post.

In 1954, the public drinking water supply of the valley was established through creation of the Kaltes Bächle spring in municipality of Mittelberg.

Economy and tourism
The most important industry in the 20th century was agriculture, which currently has only a marginal importance. As of 2015, tourism plays a major role and as early as 1960 the number of overnight stays reached a million. In 2015, there were 792,026 overnight stays in summer and 816,240 during the winter of 2015/2016.

Mobility in the valley is ensured with the tightly driven Walserbus, which is free of charge to tourists paying the tourist tax via ownership of the Walsercard.

Winter tourism
Skiing is the mainstay of winter tourism in the Kleinwalsertal, but it also has ski mountaineering and easy winter hiking. The great importance of tourism is also reflected in the winter sport infrastructure. The valley offers the opportunity to use 30 ski lifts, 6 chair lifts and 2 cable cars. The first mountain railway of the valley, the Kanzelwandbahn, was completed in Riezlern in 1955. The "Kanzelwand-Fellhorn" ski area comprises 13 facilities, some of which are modern.

Summer tourism
In the summer, tourists come for mountain hiking. There are also two very popular climbing routes (Mindelheimer Klettersteig and Zweienland Klettersteig) on the border to the neighbouring commune area of Oberstdorf, which are mostly accessed via the Kleinwalsertal because of the shorter route and easier accessibility.

Culture 
The Literaturfest Kleinwalsertal is a 2017 established literary festival that organises lectures, workshops, poetry slams and exhibitions. It takes place in autumn. The festival intends to bring together authors and the public. A project within the festival is a virtual storytelling hiking path which is an easy hike of two hours. With the help of texts, it aims at bringing people together along the path, and at blurring the boundaries of writers and readers.

As of 2019, the local football club, SV Kleinwalsertal, is one of only a few clubs in Central Europe which play in a local league based outside of the club's country. They play in the 10th tier A-Klasse Allgäu 4 in 2016–17.

References

External links
Kleinwalsertal – official website

Austria–Germany border crossings
Enclaves and exclaves
Valleys of Bavaria
Valleys of the Alps
Valleys of Vorarlberg
Vorarlberg